"Show Me" is the seventh single from John Legend's album, Once Again. The song is produced by Raphael Saadiq and Craig Street and was released as a single in December 2007. The song is noted for its vulnerability, and John has cited it as one of his favorites. Along with the release came a music video tailored to fit the theme of the Anti-Poverty campaign which John started shortly afterwards.

Song Style
Noted as being a particularly unusual track on Once Again, Show Me opens up with a guitar riff reminiscent of Jimi Hendrix and crooning, hushed, and haunting vocals similar to the tone of Jeff Buckley. Its beat is smooth and its lyrics are hopeful in prayer from a skeptical believer who wishes to find solace in a world with problems that are very real. It has also been compared to the music of Marvin Gaye and Stevie Wonder.

Music video
Directed by Lee Hirsch, the video portrays the day of a poor African child who faces difficult living condition and witnesses the relative ease of the life for a child in a higher developed country, with implications of lack of proper health care, education, public transportation, and proper agriculture. John follows him as a voyeuristic specter which the boy seems to recognize momentarily, which implies that it is in fact the spirit and willingness of those who wish to help aid as some sort of real world overlooking guardian angels. In an effort to escape the life he feels bound to, he mounts the wheel well of an airplane immediately before it ascends for flight.

The song is dedicated to Yaguine Koita and Fode Tounkara, young stowaways who died flying from Guinea to Belgium in July 1999, as well as the millions who live in poverty. It was shot in Zanzibar and Tanzania in October 2007.

Campaign
John began the Show Me Campaign to fight poverty in under developed countries. He promoted awareness by touring and visiting many universities and colleges in the United States by gathering the students and educating them of the issues he wished to involve them in. He has contributed by funding a project called Millennium Villages in Tanzania.

Tracks
 "Show Me"

References

Sources

External links
 Show Me Campaign
 Official Site

2008 singles
John Legend songs
Songs written by John Legend
2006 songs
Songs written by Raphael Saadiq
Songs written by Estelle (musician)